Agia Kyriaki is a village in Kastoria Regional Unit, Western Macedonia, Greece.  

The Greek census (1920) recorded 395 people in the village and in 1923 there were 467 inhabitants (or 180 families) who were Muslim. Following the Greek-Turkish population exchange, in 1926 within Agia Kyriaki there were 60 refugee families from Pontus. The Greek census (1928) recorded 264 village inhabitants. There were 60 refugee families (208 people) in 1928.

References

Populated places in Kastoria (regional unit)